The Hungarian Industrial & Commercial Bank (Hungarian: Magyar Ipar-és Kereskedelmi Bank) was an important Hungarian bank in the late 19th and early 20th century. It was a mediocre bank until the appointment of István Tisza, a prominent businessman and politician, as its president. Under his direction, it became the largest bank in Hungary within a decade.

Banks of Hungary